Proclitus is a genus of parasitoid wasps belonging to the family Ichneumonidae.

The genus has almost cosmopolitan distribution.

Species:
 Proclitus albidipes Forster, 1871 
 Proclitus ardentis Rossem, 1987

References

Ichneumonidae
Ichneumonidae genera